Philoxenus Anicetus (epithet means "the Invincible") was an Indo-Greek king who ruled in the region spanning the Paropamisade to Punjab. Philoxenus seems to have been quite an important king who might briefly have ruled most of the Indo-Greek territory. Bopearachchi dates Philoxenus to c. 100–95 BCE and R. C. Senior to c. 125–110 BCE.

Historians have not yet connected Philoxenus with any dynasty, but he could have been the father of the princess Kalliope, who was married to the king Hermaeus.

Coins of Philoxenos
Philoxenus struck several series of bilingual Indian silver coins, with a reverse of a mounted king, a type previously used as obverse by Antimachus II sixty years earlier and as reverse on rare types of Nicias. Whether the horseman was a dynastic emblem or a portrait of the king as a cavalryman is unclear. Several Saka kings used similar horsemen on their coinage.

His drachms were square, another feature that was rare among Indo-Greeks but standard for Sakas, and this indicates that Philoxenus had connections with the nomads that had conquered Bactria.

Philoxenus struck bronzes with female deity/bull, or Helios/Nike.

Philoxenus also minted some Attic-type tetradrachms (with Greek legend only), meant for circulation in Bactria.

Overstrikes

One overstrike is known, of Epander over Philoxenus.

Other coins

See also
 Greco-Bactrian Kingdom
 Seleucid Empire
 Greco-Buddhism
 Indo-Scythians
 Indo-Parthian Kingdom
 Kushan Empire

References
 The Greeks in Bactria and India, W. W. Tarn, Cambridge University Press.

External links
Coins of Philoxenus

Ancient history of Pakistan
Indo-Greek kings
1st-century BC rulers in Asia